Koktyubey is a rural locality (a selo) in Tarumovsky District, Republic of Dagestan, Russia. The population was 665 as of 2010. There are 19 streets.

Geography 
Koktyubey is located 34 km northeast of Tarumovka (the district's administrative centre) by road. Talovka is the nearest rural locality.

References 

Rural localities in Tarumovsky District